There are 92 protected areas of Taiwan. Together they cover an area of 7,146 km2  , or 19.72% of Taiwan's land area. Protected areas are classed as national parks, nature reserves, forest reserves, major wildlife habitats, and wildlife refuges.

National parks

National parks are managed by the Construction and Planning Agency. They are IUCN protected area category II.
 Dongsha National Park 3600.32 km2, est. 2007
 Kenting National Park 329.27 km2, est. 1984
 Kinmen National Park 36.32 km2, est. 1995
 Shei-pa National Park 769.59 km2, est. 1992
 Taijiang National Park 47.38 km2, est. 2009
 Taroko National Park 980.40 km2, est. 1986
 Yangmingshan National Park 113.66 km2, est. 1985
 Yushan National Park 1031.21 km2, est. 1985

Nature reserves
Nature reserves are managed by the Forestry Bureau. They are IUCN protected area category Ia.
 Alishan Taiwan Pleione Nature Reserve 0.58 km2, est. 1992
 Chatianshan Nature Reserve 79.74 km2, est. 1992
 Chuyunshan Nature Reserve 60.42 km2, est. 1992
 Danshuei River Mangrove Nature Reserve 1.16 km2, est. 1986
 Dawu Working Circle Taiwan Amentotaxus Nature Reserve 0.84 km2, est. 1986
 Dawushan Nature Reserve 478.48 km2, est. 1988
 Guandu Nature Reserve 0.48 km2, est. 1986
 Hapen Nature Reserve 3.20 km2, est. 1986
 Hokutolite Nature Reserve 0.002 km2, est. 2013
 Jiujiu Peaks Nature Reserve 12.06 km2, est. 2000
 Kenting Uplifted Coral Reefs Nature Reserve 1.33 km2, est. 1994
 Miaoli Sanyi Huoyanshan Nature Reserve 2.2 km2, est. 1986
 Nan-ao Broad-leaved Forest Nature Reserve 1.84 km2, est. 1992
 Penghu Columnar Basalt Nature Reserve 0.37 km2, est. 1992
 Pinglin Taiwan Keteleeria Nature Reserve 13.6 km2, est. 1986
 Taitung Hongye Village Taitung Cycas Nature Reserve 3.17 km2, est. 1986
 Wazihwei Nature Reserve 0.14 km2, est. 1994
 Wushanding Mud Volcano Nature Reserve 0.04 km2, est. 1992
 Wushihbi Coastal Nature Reserve 3.54 km2, est. 1994
 Xuhai-Guanyinbi Nature Reserve 8.38 km2, est. 2012
 Yuanyang Lake Nature Reserve 3.71 km2, est. 1986

Forest reserves
Forest reserves are managed by the Forestry Bureau. They are IUCN protected area category IV unless otherwise noted.
 Coastal Range Taitung Cycas Forest Reserve 8 km2, est. 2006 
 Dawu Taiwan Keteleeria Forest Reserve 12.76 km2, est. 2006
 Guangshan Formosan Date Palm Forest Reserve 23.89 km2, est. 2006
 Jia-xian Sih-de Fossil Forest Reserve	4.48 km2, est. 2006 (IUCN category III)
 Shih-ba-luo-han-shan Forest Reserve 6.39 km2, est. 2006 (IUCN category III)
 Xue-ba Forest Reserve 208.7 km2, est. 2006 (IUCN category not reported)

Major wildlife habitats
Major wildlife habitats are managed by the Forestry Bureau. They are IUCN protected area category IV.
 Chachayalaishan Major Wildlife Habitat 20.07 km2, est. 2000
 Chayi County Aogu Major Wildlife Habitat 6.61 km2, est. 2009
 Ci-lan Major Wildlife Habitat 565.48 km2, est. 2000
 Coastal Mountain Range Major Wildlife Habitat 32.71 km2, est. 2000
 Dadu River Mouth Major Wildlife Habitat 31.50 km2, est. 1998
 Danda Major Wildlife Habitat 1212.14 km2, est. 2000
 Feitsui Reservoir Snake-eating (Yellow-margined Box) Turtle Major Wildlife Habitat	12.92 km2, est. 2013
 Guanshan Major Wildlife Habitat 694.42 km2, est. 2000
 Guanwu Broad-tailed Swallowtail Major Wildlife Habitat 3.51 km2, est. 2000
 Guanyin Coast Major Wildlife Habitat 5.21 km2, est. 2000
 Huaping Islet Major Wildlife Habitat 0.007 km2, est. 1995
 Jin-shuei-ying Major Wildlife Habitat	11.3 km2, est. 2000
 Kaohsiung County Sanmin Township Nanzixian River Major Wildlife Habitat 1.78 km2, est. 1998
 Keya River Mouth and Sianshan Wetland Major Wildlife Habitat 14.22 km2, est. 2001
 Li-jia Major Wildlife Habitat 10.30 km2, est. 2000
 Lulinshan Major Wildlife Habitat 4.9 km2, est. 2000
 Matsu islands Major Wildlife Habitat 1 km2, est. 1999
 Mianhua Islet Major Wildlife Habitat 0.22 km2, est. 1995
 Penghu County Mao Islet Major Wildlife Habitat 0.37 km2, est. 1997
 Ruei-yan River Major Wildlife Habitat 27.57 km2, est. 2000
 Shuang-guei Lake Major Wildlife Habitat 489.03 km2, est. 2000
 Shuei-lian Major Wildlife Habitat 3.39 km2, est. 2001
 Syue-shan-keng River Major Wildlife Habitat 6.72 km2, est. 2000
 Taichung County Gaomei Major Wildlife Habitat 7.35 km2, est. 2004
 Taichung County Wuling Formosan Landlocked Salmon Major Wildlife Habitat 72.22 km2, est. 1995
 Tainan City Sicao Major Wildlife Habitat 5.43 km2, est. 2006
 Tainan County Zengwen River Mouth Major Wildlife Habitat 3.2 km2, est. 2002
 Taipei City Zhongxing and Yungfu Bridges Waterbird Major Wildlife Habitat 1.61 km2, est. 1997
 Taitung County Haiduan Township Xinwulu River Major Wildlife Habitat 1.93 km2, est. 1998
 Taoyuan Gaorong Major Wildlife Habitat 0.01 km2, est. 2011
 Taoyuan Guan-Xin Algal Reefs Ecosystem Major Wildlife Habitat	3.15 km2, est. 2014
 Tashan Major Wildlife Habitat 7.41 km2, est.2001
 Yilan County Lanyang River Mouth Waterbird Major Wildlife Habitat 2.06 km2, est. 1996
 Yilan County Shuang-lian-Pi Major Wildlife Habitat 7.5 km2, est. 2005
 Yilan County Wuweigang Major Wildlife Habitat	1.14 km2, est. 2014
 Yuli Major Wildlife Habitat 114.12 km2, est. 2000
 Yunlin Huben Fairy Pitta Major Wildlife Habitat 17.38 km2, est. 2008

Wildlife refuges
Wildllife refuges are managed by the Forestry Bureau. They are IUCN protected area category IV.
 Caomei Wetlands Wildlife Refuge 7.35 km2, est. 2004
 Dadu River Mouth Wildlife Refuge 26.7 km2, est. 1995
 Feitsui Reservoir Snake-eating (Yellow-margined Box) Turtle Wildlife Refuge 12.92 km2, est. 2013
 Formosan Landlocked Salmon Refuge 72.22 km2, est. 1997
 Hsinchu City Coastal Wildlife Refuge 14.22 km2, est. 2001
 Hsinwulue River Wildlife Refuge 1.93 km2, est. 1998
 Kaohsiung County Sanmin Township Nanzhxian River Wildlife Refuge 1.78 km2, est. 1993
 Lanyang River Mouth Waterbird Refuge 2.07 km2, est. 1996
 Matsu Islands Tern Refuge 1 km2, est. 2000
 Mianhua and Huaping Islets Wildlife Refuge 0.23 km2, est. 1996
 Penghu County Mao Islet Seabird Refuge 0.37825 km2, est. 1991
 Penghu County Wang-an Island Green Turtle Nesting Refuge 7.54 km2, est. 1995
 Tainan City Sicao Wildlife Refuge 5.43 km2, est. 1994
 Tainan County Zengwen River Mouth North Bank Black-faced Spoonbill Refuge 3.2 km2, est. 2002
 Taipei City Waterbird Refuge 1.61 km2, est. 1993
 Taoyuan Gaorong Wildlife Refuge 0.01 km2, est. 2012
 Taoyuan Guan-Xin Algal Reefs Ecosystem Wildlife Refuge 3.15 km2, est. 2014
 Wuweigang Waterbird Refuge 1.03 km2, est. 1998
 Yilan County Shuang-lian-pi Wildlife Refuge 0.17 km2, est. 2003
 Yuli Wildlife Refuge 114.12 km2, est. 2000

References

 
Taiwan
protected areas